Michael Phillips was a British competitive ice dancer. With partner Linda Shearman, he became the 1963 European champion and 1963 World silver medalist. He died in August 2016.

Results
(with Linda Shearman)

References

 Skatabase: 1960s Worlds Results
 Skatabase: 1960s Europeans Results

2016 deaths
British male ice dancers
Year of birth missing
World Figure Skating Championships medalists
European Figure Skating Championships medalists
Date of death missing